Basketball Academie Limburg, commonly known as BAL, is a Dutch basketball club based in Weert in the province of Limburg. The club was founded in 2013 as an academy to develop youth players from the province of Limburg. The club entered the Dutch Basketball League for the 2017–18 season after the dissolution of the professional team BSW. Currently, the team plays in the BNXT League.

In 2021, BAL won its first-ever trophy when it won the DBL Cup in surprising fashion as the team was ranked eight in the DBL that season.

History

Foundation
The club was established on 9 April 2013 to function as a club for regional talent from the province of Limburg. In its first years, the team played with several youth teams in domestic competitions.

In the 2017 offseason the professional club BSW from Weert and BAL intended a merger, which would integrate BSW into BAL. Following BSW going defunct during this offseason, BAL decided to take its place in the DBL. As BAL played in the same home arena and the team consisted of several of the same players, the team can be considered a phoenix club. Radenko Varagić coached the team.

First DBL seasons
In its debut season, BAL finished in the ninth and last place in the DBL, winning 4 out of its 32 games. The team consisted of a selection of young promising players, such as guard Sam van Dijk who was named the DBL Most Improved Player in the club's debut season. On 1 August 2018, BAL signed its first ever foreign player when American center Tony Washington signed for one year. In its second season, BAL once again finished last in the DBL with this time five wins in 2018–19.

In the 2020–21 season, BAL reached the playoffs for the first time after finishing in the eight seed. This season the team also won the 2021 DBL Cup, the club's first-ever trophy. In the semi-finals, BAL upset first-seeded ZZ Leiden and in the final the team was too strong for Yoast United. Trevor Jasinsky led the team in scoring in the final with 27 points.

Since the 2021–22 season, BAL plays in the BNXT League, in which the national leagues of Belgium and the Netherlands have been merged.

Honours
DBL Cup
Champions (1): 2021
Dutch Supercup
Runners-up (1): 2021

Season by season

Players

Current roster

Individual awards
BNXT League Rising Star of the Year
Sander Hollanders – 2022
DBL Most Improved Player
Sam van Dijk – 2018
DBL All-Rookie Team
Jacco Fritz – 2018
Nino Gorissen – 2018
Ivan Simic – 2019

Top scorers by seasons
The following players led BAL in scoring in each DBL season:

Club records
Bold denotes still active with team. As of 14 April 2021:

Notes

References

External links 
 Eurobasket.com BAL Page

Basketball teams established in 2013
2013 establishments in the Netherlands
Dutch Basketball League teams
Basketball teams in the Netherlands
Sports clubs in Weert